North Berkeley is an unincorporated community in Morgan County in the U.S. state of West Virginia's Eastern Panhandle. The community lies between the Town of Bath (Berkeley Springs) limits and Jimtown. Like Jimtown, North Berkeley does not lie within the limits of Berkeley Springs proper, but it is generally considered a neighborhood of the town. The community is the site of the North Berkeley Primary School.

References

Unincorporated communities in Morgan County, West Virginia
Unincorporated communities in West Virginia